Mark Andrew "Patsy" McGaffigan (September 12, 1888 – December 22, 1940) was a Major League Baseball second baseman and shortstop who played for two seasons. He played for the Philadelphia Phillies in 73 total games in 1917 and 1918.

External links

1888 births
1940 deaths
Philadelphia Phillies players
Major League Baseball second basemen
Major League Baseball shortstops
Baseball players from Illinois
Pekin Celestials players
Peoria Distillers players
Dubuque Hustlers players
Keokuk Indians players
Lincoln Tigers players
Vernon Tigers players
Richmond Virginians (minor league) players
Sacramento Senators players
Oakland Oaks (baseball) players
Salt Lake City Bees players
Columbus Senators players
Shreveport Sports players
People from Carlyle, Illinois